The 2013 Big League World Series took place from July 24–31 in Easley, South Carolina, United States. Greenville County, South Carolina defeated Maracaibo, Venezuela in the championship game.

Teams

Results

United States Group

International Group

Elimination Round

References

Big League World Series
Big League World Series